is a Japanese comedian.

Nozawa is represented with Yoshimoto Creative Agency. Her grandfather was author Naojiro Kuga, her uncle was voice actor and theatre director Nachi Nozawa, and her cousin is actor So Nozawa. Nozawa lives in San Francisco. Her eldest daughter is mixed martial arts fighter Juju Auclair.

She is currently active in the comedian-based idol group Yoshimotozaka46.

Programme appearances
After her marriage Nozawa appeared once or twice in Japan every year, and performs guest appearances who calls herself a "migrant" irregularly.

Former appearances

Kansai local

Chūkyō local

Discography

Filmography

Bibliography

References

External links
 Official blog 
 
 
 

Japanese women comedians
1963 births
Comedians from Tokyo
Japanese television personalities
Japanese women singers
Living people
Yoshimotozaka46 members